The Middletown Woodrow Wilson High School is a former high school, now used as residential apartments, located at 339 Hunting Hill Avenue, Middletown, Connecticut.  Built in 1931, it was the city's first unified high school, a role it served until 1958.  It then served as a junior high school before being adapted to its present residential use.  The building was listed on the National Register of Historic Places in 1986.

Description and history
The Middletown Woodrow Wilson High School is located in what is now a predominantly residential area south of downtown Middletown, on the west side of Hunting Hill Avenue south of its junction with Russell Street.   It is a three-story structure, built of brick with concrete trim, and covered by a hip roof topped by a small tower and cupola.  Its main entrance is in a prominent Classical Revival portico, with paired pilasters flanking the second and third-floor windows, garlanded panels between those floors, and a fully pedimented gable with modillion blocks and a round panel at the center.

The school was built in 1931, on what was then a more rural agricultural area.  It was designed by Linus Baldwin, of Towner & Sellew Associates, to meet the growing demand for education in the city's more rural outlying areas.  At first considered for use as a junior high school, and had what were then state-of-the-art facilities, including specialized classrooms, laboratory and vocational shop areas, and art and music rooms.  It served as the city's high school until 1958, and then as a junior high school, before it was rehabilitated for residential use.

Notable alumni
Bill Denehy (baseball), former Major League Baseball pitcher

See also
National Register of Historic Places listings in Middletown, Connecticut

References

Colonial Revival architecture in Connecticut
Neoclassical architecture in Connecticut
School buildings completed in 1931
School buildings on the National Register of Historic Places in Connecticut
Buildings and structures in Middletown, Connecticut
Schools in Middlesex County, Connecticut
National Register of Historic Places in Middlesex County, Connecticut